Yaşar Karadağ (born 7 July 1976) is a Turkish educator and politician of Azeri origin, who won a seat in the Turkish parliament in 2018 with the right-wing Nationalist Movement Party. Karadağ was voted into the top three best politicians from Eastern Anatolia.

Education and career 
Karadağ was born on 7 July 1976 in Iğdır, Turkey. He graduated from the department of Education at Atatürk University in 1997. He was a teacher for the Ministry of National Education and was a boardmember at a private school organisation in Iğdır. He is member of TURKPA.

Personal life 
He is married and has three children.

References

Living people
1976 births
Nationalist Movement Party politicians